Walther Wüst (7 May 1901 – 21 March 1993) was a German Indologist who served as Rector of the University of Munich from 1941 to 1945.

Biography
Walther Wust was born in Kaiserslautern, Germany on 7 May 1901. Wüst studied Indology and other subjects at the University of Munich, and became a specialist in the Vedas. He received his PhD at the age of 22 with a dissertation on the Rigveda and its relation to Indo-European mythology.

Wüst became a privatdozent at the age of 25, and by the age of 31 he had become a professor. He joined the Nazi Party in 1933, and subsequently became an agent of the Sicherheitsdienst. In early 1935, Wüst was made Professor of Aryan Culture and Linguistics and Dean of the Faculty of Philosophy at the University of Munich. Prominent students of Wüst at the University of Munich include Davud Monshizadeh and Karl Hoffmann. He was admitted to the Schutzstaffel in 1936, and was made President of the Ahnenerbe in 1937. As such he became the de facto leader of the Ahnenerbe under the nominal chief Heinrich Himmler. As the leader of Ahnenerbe, Wüst played a leading role in the management of universities in Nazi Germany. He was made Rector at the University of Munich in 1941. In 1943, Wüst participated in the development and spread of Nazi propaganda in the Middle East, which attempted to make Arabs and Muslims sympathetic to Adolf Hitler. Wüst was directly involved in the arrest of Hans and Sophie Scholl.

After the end of World War II in Europe, Wüst was arrested by the Office of Military Government, United States. He was interned at Dachau until 1948, and fired from the University of Munich in 1946. On 9 November 1949, the denazification courts sentenced Wüst to three years of hard labor. He also lost his right to exercise his profession, but was later able to publish on the subject of Indology. He regained the title of Professor in 1951, but never chaired a department at a German university again. Wüst died in Munich on 21 March 1993.

See also
 Hans Reinerth

References

Sources

 Maximilian Schreiber: Walther Wüst. Dekan und Rektor der Universität München 1935 – 1945. Herbert Utz, München 2008, 

1901 births
1993 deaths
German Indologists
German male non-fiction writers
German orientalists
Indo-Europeanists
Academic staff of the Ludwig Maximilian University of Munich
People from Kaiserslautern
SS-Oberführer
Ahnenerbe members